Denis Nsanzamahoro (died 5 September 2019) was a Rwandan actor and filmmaker. He had established himself as one of the most celebrated actors that the Rwandan film industry has ever had since he launched his professional career in filmmaking in 1999, having successfully starred in popular films, from locals like Rwasa and Amarira y’Urukundo, Sakabaka among others, as well as several commercials, He was notable for movies such as 100 Days and Sometimes in April. The last film in which he starred is Petit Pays, produced by Gael Faye in June 2019. He died suddenly on 5 September 2019, due to complications from diabetes.

References

External links 

2019 deaths
Rwandan male actors
Rwandan film directors
20th-century male actors
21st-century male actors
Deaths from diabetes
Year of birth missing
Male film actors
Place of birth missing
Place of death missing